The 1938 Australian Grand Prix was a motor race held at the Mount Panorama Circuit near Bathurst in New South Wales, Australia on 18 April 1938. It was staged over 40 laps of the six kilometre circuit for a total distance of 241 kilometres. The race, which was organised by the Light Car Club of New South Wales, attracted 38 entries, 30 of which started the race. 33,000 people paid for admission to the circuit on race day.

The race was the tenth Australian Grand Prix and the first to be held in New South Wales. It marked a revival of the Australian Grand Prix title which had not been used since April 1935. The track utilised was the newly completed Mount Panorama Circuit, a dirt surface tourist drive which climbed the slope of Mount Panorama in the Bald Hills to the south of the city of Bathurst. The Grand Prix was the feature race at the inaugural meeting at the rural New South Wales venue. With a circuit length of just over 3.8 miles it was the shortest circuit to host the Australian Grand Prix to this time.

The format for the race was much the same as used previously for some of the Australian Grand Prix at Phillip Island, incorporating a handicap start with the slowest car starting first and other cars starting at intervals according to their predicted pace. The meeting was enlivened by two visiting British drivers, Peter Whitehead and Alan Sinclair who had brought with them supercharged racing machinery, respectively an ERA and an Alta. While Sinclair was unable to start the race, Whitehead did and it was quickly realised that his position as the scratch handicap competitor was too generous and by races end he had driven through the field. The only driver who had offered any resistance was Les Burrows driving a 1933 Terraplane-based racing car. However Burrows slowed near the end, his engine reducing in power sufficiently to allow Whitehead to sweep by to take victory despite Burrows starting the race 15 minutes earlier.

The initial release of official results attracted various protests and led to a recount, with some placings subsequently changed.

Whitehead was awarded the RAC of Australia Cup and £250 prizemoney for winning the race. He also received £100, the NRMA Trophy and the title of Australian Road Racing Champion for achieving the fastest time and the Courtney and Bohlsen Cup for setting the fastest lap.

Classification 
Results as follows.

References

External links
 40,000 watch big race, The Bathurst National Advocate, Tuesday, April 19, 1938, page 2, as archived at trove.nla.gov.au

Grand Prix
Australian Grand Prix
Motorsport in Bathurst, New South Wales
Australian Grand Prix